Chitra Tripathi (born 11 May 1989) is an Indian news anchor currently working in Hindi news channel AAJ TAK News. Tripathi started her career in 2005 from Gorakhpur Doordarshan. She has worked with news channels like Sahara India, India News, News 24, ETV Network, ABP News.

She joined ABP News in 2016 and hosted shows including Kaun Banega Rastrapati, 2019 Kaun Jeetega, Modi ke 4 Saal. On 11 February she resigned from ABP and joined Aaj Tak as Deputy Editor and first covered the 2019 India–Pakistan border skirmishes. She had covered shows on Aaj Tak like Dangal after death of Rohit Sardana, Shankhnaad replacing her former show Desh Tak on the same channel. She was awarded with the Ramnath Goenka Award in 2015 for her Kashmir coverage. On 11th Of October 2022, she announced on twitter about her new assignment with ABP News where she files report from Safai on the last journey of Neta ji Mulayam Singh Yadav. To her viewers surprise not even completing her innings at ABP news for a month, she rejoined her ex-channel Aaj Tak, which she considered a better workplace.

Personal life 
In 2008, she married her long-time boyfriend Atul Agrawal, a Hindi TV journalist and news anchor.

Career 
Tripathi is currently with Aajtak channel. Tripathi started her career in 2005 from Gorakhpur Doordarshan. She has worked with news channels like Sahara India, India News, News 24, ETV Network, ABP News. She joined ABP News in 2016 and hosted many shows like Kaun Banega Rastrapati, 2019 Kaun Jeetega, Modi ke 4 Saal, etc. On 11 February she resigned from ABP and joined Aaj Tak as Deputy Editor later to resign from Aaj Tak and join ABP again. She has covered many shows on Aaj Tak like Dangal after death of Rohit Sardana, Shankhnaad replacing her former show Desh Tak on the same channel. She was awarded with the Ramnath Goenka Award in 2015 for her Kashmir coverage. She is also known for Bullet Reporter on Aaj Tak which is an election-based show. She had covered so many events like 2017 Indian presidential election, 2019 Indian general election, Kumbh Mela 2019, 2021 West Bengal Elections, 2022 Uttar Pradesh elections, 2022 Gyanvapi Masjid Survey, etc.

References 

Living people
India Today people
Indian women television journalists
Indian television news anchors
Indian political journalists
Indian television talk show hosts
Deen Dayal Upadhyay Gorakhpur University alumni
1986 births